Willis Roy Eken (April 12, 1931 - May 8, 2010) was an American politician and farmer.

Born in Ada, Minnesota, Eken graduated from Twin Valley High School in Twin Valley, Minnesota and was a farmer. He served as President of the Minnesota Farmers Union. Eken served in the Minnesota House of Representatives, as a Democrat, from 1971 to 1984. His son Kent Eken also served in the Minnesota State Legislature. Eken died in Twin Valley, Minnesota.

Notes

1931 births
2010 deaths
People from Ada, Minnesota
Democratic Party members of the Minnesota House of Representatives